The Shelbourne Hotel is a historic hotel in Dublin, Ireland, situated in a landmark building on the north side of St Stephen's Green.  Currently owned by Kennedy Wilson and operated by Marriott International, the hotel has 265 rooms in total and reopened in March 2007 after undergoing an eighteen-month refurbishment.

History
The Shelbourne Hotel was founded in 1824 by Martin Burke, a native of Tipperary, when he acquired three adjoining townhouses overlooking Stephen's Green, Europe's largest garden square. Burke named his grand new hotel The Shelbourne, after William Petty, 2nd Earl of Shelburne. William Makepeace Thackeray was an early guest, staying in 1842 and including a piece about the Shelbourne in The Irish Sketch-Book (1843).

In the early 1900s, Alois Hitler jr., the elder half-brother of Adolf Hitler, worked in the hotel while in Dublin.

During the 1916 Easter Rising the hotel was occupied by 40 British troops under Captain Andrews to counter the Irish Citizen Army and Irish Volunteer forces, commanded by Michael Mallin, who had occupied Stephen's Green. In 1922, the Constitution of the Irish Free State was drafted in room 112, now known as The Constitution Room.

The facade was refurbished in 2016, winning an award from the Irish Georgian Society. In December 2018 UEFA's executive committee made the draw for the 2019 UEFA Nations League Finals in the hotel.

Statues
A major redesign by John McCurdy was completed in 1867, with the Foundry of Val d'Osne casting the four external caryatid style torchère statues. These were based on two repeated beaux-arts neoclassical models originally sculpted by the prolific French sculptor Mathurin Moreau entitled Égyptienne – the two female Ancient Egyptian figures flanking either side of the front door, and Négresse – the two female ancient Kushite (Nubian) figures flanking either corner of the main building. All four statues are wearing gold coloured anklets, and are draped, with jewellery picked out in gilt while supporting a torch with a frosted glass flambeau shade. All four statues are on a circular base with a further square metal plinth with cartouches to the angles indicating royal descent.

In feint writing at the front of the circular base of all four statues can be seen the name of the foundry which produced the statues Val d'Osne. Of the several other examples of the castings, the most notable can be seen in the porch of the hôtel de ville (town hall) in the French town of Remiremont as well as outside the mausoleum of the architect Temple Hoyne Buell in Denver, Colorado and in the Jardins do Palácio de Cristal in Porto. In all three cases the door is flanked either side by one Égyptienne and one Négresse statue indicating parity.

In July 2020, the statues at the front of the building were removed by management as a precautionary response to the toppling and removal of statues following the murder of George Floyd and Black Lives Matter protests. This move resulted from the belief that either two or all four of the statues represented Nubian slaves shown in manacles. Both histories of the hotel, that of 1951 by Elizabeth Bowen and that of 1999 by Michael O'Sullivan, state that two of the statues represent slaves or servants, with Bowen stating "on each stands a female statue, Nubian in aspect, holding a torch shaped lamp". Kyle Leyden, an art historian at the Courtauld Institute, argued that none of the statues are of the established "Nubian slave" type, and that all four figures wear anklets indicating aristocratic status, rather than shackles. After an examination by Paula Murphy, an art historian at University College Dublin, concluded that the statues were not representations of slaves, it was announced that they would be restored to their plinths. After being cleaned, they were reinstalled on the night of 14 December.

Popular culture

In James Joyce's Ulysses, Leopold Bloom remembers the Shelbourne as where "Mrs Miriam Dandrade", a "Divorced Spanish American" sold him "her old wraps and black underclothes".

See also
 Shelbourne Road

References

Further reading

Autograph Collection Hotels
Hotels in Dublin (city)
St Stephen's Green
State guesthouses